Qızılağac (also, Kyzylagach and Kyzylagadzh) is a village and municipality in the Goychay Rayon of Azerbaijan.  It has a population of 1,365. The municipality consists of the villages of Qızılağac and Mollahacılı.

References 

Populated places in Goychay District